Jirim may refer to:

 Jurm District
 Tongliao previously known as Jirim League in Inner Mongolia, China